Maciej Jan Łopiński (born 19 August 1947 in Gdańsk, Poland), Polish journalist, minister in the President's Office from 2005 until 2010 and again from 2015 until 2016, from 2011 until 2013 election member of parliament and since 2020 the former acting chairman of the Polish public broadcaster TVP.

Biography

He graduated in Polish philology at the University of Gdańsk. In 1971 he joined the Polish United Workers' Party, was a member of the party to 14 December 1981. He worked as a journalist, Głos Wybrzeża (1974–1977) and the weekly magazine Czas (1977–1981). In a state of war he edited the Solidarność – Pismo Regionu Gdańskiego. Also published in the press in exile – Kultura, Zeszyty Historyczne and Kontakt. In 1984, together with Mariusz Wilk and Zbigniew Gache wrote a book. Konspira The thing about the underground "Solidarity".
In 1988 he participated in strikes in the Gdansk Shipyard. At the same time he was a member of the Regional Coordinating Committee "Solidarity" in Gdansk, and from 1989 until 1990 served on the Interim Board in open Gdańsk Region Solidarity.

From 1989 to 1991 he served as editor of Tygodnik Gdański." Then he became a vice president of the board, Prasa Bałty, and in 1998 chairman of the board Pomerania Development Agency from 2002 to 2005 he was chairman of the Group Managing Pomerania SA.

23 December 2005 from President Lech Kaczyński was nominated for the position of Secretary of State in the President's Office responsible for media policy. This function is held to 23 July 2007, then became the head of the President's Cabinet. July 6, 2010 was dismissed as head of the Cabinet of the President of the Republic.

In 2011, in the parliamentary elections was the Law and Justice candidate for the Sejm of the district of Gdańsk (as an independent). He received a mandate in the parliament, receiving 15 794 votes.

Sources
 Solidarty note

External links
  Official Website of Maciej Łopiński

1947 births
Law and Justice politicians
Living people
Politicians from Gdańsk
Polish dissidents
Polish Roman Catholics
Solidarity (Polish trade union) activists
University of Gdańsk alumni